Fuladi in Iran may refer to:
Fuladi, Kermanshah
Fuladi-ye Olya, Kermanshah Province
Fuladi-ye Sofla, Kermanshah Province
Fuladi, Markazi